Highway 999 is a provincial highway in the far north region of the Canadian province of Saskatchewan. It serves the small settlement of Camsell Portage on the north side of Lake Athabasca. Camsell Portage is the northern-most settlement in Saskatchewan. Highway 999 is one of the few highways in Saskatchewan that is completely isolated (by land) from the other highways of the province, without even a regular seasonal/winter road link, and thus is only used for local traffic.

Google Maps shows a longer road designated Highway 999 east of the hamlet, and not connecting with it; instead this 999 begins near Charlot River Airport due east of Camsell Portage, and runs several kilometres to a residential area near Dam Lake.

See also
Roads in Saskatchewan
Transportation in Saskatchewan

References 

999